Hettiarachchige Don Marcus Conrad Senarathna Samaranayake (born 8 April 1914 – died 4 June 2000 as මාක් සමරනායක) [Sinhala]), popularly as Mark Samaranayake, was an actor in Sri Lankan cinema and stage drama. One of the earliest pillars in Sinhala cinema, Samaranayake acted in several critically acclaimed films such as Peralena Iranama, Perakadoru Bena, Kapati Arakshakaya, Duppathage Duka and Daivayogaya.

Personal life
He was born on 8 April 1914 in Weliveriya, Gampaha as the fifth child in a family with eight siblings. His father, Charles Samaranayake, was a notary and his mother Dona Isabella Perera was a housewife. He had three elder sisters: Josephine, Harriet and Lori, an elder brother: George, two sisters: Ellison and Marie, and a younger brother: Benedict. His father died when Mark was a child.

He received his primary education at the Sinhala School in Weliweriya and then went to Saint Joseph's College, Colombo for secondary education. Popular actor Laddie Ranasinghe was his classmate. Mark and Laddie both attended St. Aloysius Seminary in their youth where his father had dedicated Mark to the church.

In 1950, he married Pearl Jayawardena, a fellow actress. The couple had two daughters: Shirani, Damayanthi and one son Tiron. His eldest daughter Shirani died at a hospital in Paris in February 2014. She was a mother of three who made a minor role in the film Duppathage Duka as a child artist in 1956. Her funeral took place on 15 February 2014 in Paris.

He died on 4 June 2000 at the age of 86 after a serious illness.

Career
At the age of 14, the college held an open singing competition, where Mark became the winner and Laddie became the runner-up. After school, Mark worked as an assistant agricultural inspector in the Army. During this period in 1945, he met Laddie by accident in Pettah. Laddie invited Mark to join in his stage drama. He accepted the offer and went to the Arcadian Drama Club in Borella and acted in the play Mathabhedaya. After that, Mark also formed the Drama Society called 'Lunuwila Victory' in 1946 and produced three stage plays: Andha Aalaya, Wasanawa and Aladdin. He later produced a play called Riyadura, co-starring Josephine Jayalath, who was the elder sister of popular actress Florida Jayalath.

When the play Riyadura was performed in Negombo, famous artist Rukmani Devi and Eddie Jayamanne of the then Minerva Drama Troupe participated to watch the play. Later in the day, he was invited to meet Eddie and Rukmani at their home in Bolavalana. Then, Eddie introduced Mark to filmmaker B. A. W. Jayamanne. Jayamanne casts Mark as the school inspector in his 1948 film Kapati Arakshakaya.

After the success of the film, he was selected for many films. In 1949, he played Rukmani's 'evil husband' in the film Peralena Iranama. Then he became the 'Hetti' in Weradunu Kurumanama (1948) and 'carpenter' in Perakadoru Bena in 1955. Then his notable acting came as an arrogant woman as a 'cunning magician' in the film Ahankara Sthree and as 'Buddhi' in the film Matalan in 1955. In 1956, he made his most dramatic character of 'Inspector Jayasinghe' in the film Duppathage Duka. In the film, his friend Laddie acted as main antagonist 'Baladeva' and his wife Pearl as 'Baladeva's sister'. His acting in the film is rated as one of the best earliest performances in Sinhala cinema.

In his last years, he played several characters of an elderly father in the film such as Thushara, Sahanaya, Me Desa Kumatada and Aege Adara Kathawa. As an assistant director, he was involved in the films Siriyalatha, Daivayogaya, and Magul Poruwa. His portrayal of the elderly ascetic 'Ruchika' in the film Daivayogaya was critically acclaimed. He last acted in the film Viyaru Minisa in 1992. Later in 1997, he was honored with "Swarna Jayanthi" Award for his contribution to Sinhala cinema at the 11th Presidential Award.

Filmography

References

External links
 

Sri Lankan male film actors
Sinhalese male actors
1914 births
2000 deaths